Khaled Musa Al Henefat (born 7 July 1972) is the Jordanian Minister of Agriculture. He was appointed as minister on 1 October 2016.

Education 
Henefat holds a Bachelor in Mechanical Engineering (1995) from Al-Balqaʼ Applied University.

References

External links 

 Ministry of Agriculture

1972 births
21st-century Jordanian politicians
Living people
Government ministers of Jordan
Agriculture ministers of Jordan

Al-Balqa` Applied University alumni